Little Neston is a village south of Neston and situated on the Wirral Peninsula, Cheshire, England. Little Neston is administratively part of Cheshire West and Chester and had a population of 3,390 at the 2001 Census.

The settlement was mentioned in the Domesday Book as Little Nestone.

Together with Neston, it is a former mining village, with shafts dug out underneath the River Dee.

The marshes of the River Dee are popular with bird watchers and horticulturalists because of the wide range of flora and fauna to be found in the area.

Lord Nelson's mistress, Emma Hamilton, was born in nearby Ness and is remembered locally with the Lady Hamilton pub.

Little Neston is home to St Winifride's RC Primary School on Mellock Lane and Woodfall Primary School on Woodfall Lane.  Neston Primary School on Burton Road is also in Little Neston. The nearest high school is Neston High School in Raby Park Road, Neston.

See also

Listed buildings in Neston

References

External links

 Neston website

Villages in Cheshire
Neston